Romundstad may refer to:

Romundstad, Trøndelag, a village in the municipality of Rindal in Trøndelag county, Norway
Romundstad (surname), a Norwegian surname
Romundstad School, a school in the municipality of Rindal in Trøndelag county, Norway